The Americas Regional Round of the Monroe E. Price Media Law Moot Court Competition has been held annually at the Benjamin N. Cardozo School of Law in New York City since 2013. The top eight teams advance to the International Round held at the University of Oxford.

International law
Moot court competitions